Rudong County is under the administration of Nantong, Jiangsu province, China, and lies on the Yellow Sea coast. It administers 14 towns and five districts. The 14 towns are Juegang, Matang, Fengli, Caobu, Chahe, Shuangdian, Xindian, Hekou, Yuanzhuang, Changsha, Ju, Yangkou, Bencha and Dayu. The county seat is Juegang .

Administrative divisions
In the present, Rudong County has 14 towns. 
14 towns

Climate

Etymology 
The county took its name because it is located to the east of Rugao County and was once part of it. The ancient name of it was Fuhaizhou, which meant a small sand island in the ocean.

Demographics and languages 
The county has many extraneous people from the south of the Yangtse River (Changjiang River), so there are two main dialects: Rudonghua which is a branch of Jianghuai Mandarin and Shadihua (Wu: Sodiwo ), which is a branch of the Wu language.

Economy 
Rudong is located on the bank of the Yellow Sea. As a result, there is a sizable fishing industry and the county was named "the place of seafood in China" by the Chinese Cooking Association in 2007. Rudong also contains a harbor for commercial cargo. Yankou Harbor was launched in May 2011 and includes a facility for unloading liquified natural gas. In addition, there is a wind farm near Rudong's sea bank. The farm contained 217 turbines as of 2009, making it the largest in the country in its grade.

Transportation
The Hai'an–Rudong railway opened in 2014 and has two passenger stations in Rudong County: Bingcha and Rudong.

See also
Shidian, Rudong County

References

External links 

County-level divisions of Jiangsu
Nantong